Commencement of action is the formal procedure by which legal proceedings are initiated.  Commencement of civil lawsuits begins when the plaintiff files the complaint with the court.  Criminal proceedings are typically commenced by a government prosecutor.  In many U.S. jurisdictions, depending on the rules, prosecutors may have the option to commence a criminal action by filing the petition directly with the court or by seeking an indictment from a grand jury.

See also
 Petition
 Cause of action
 Federal Rules of Civil Procedure
 Federal Rules of Criminal Procedure
 Comminatory

Legal procedure